Sérgio Sant'Anna (30 October 1941 – 10 May 2020) was a Brazilian writer, born in  Rio de Janeiro.

Life
He wrote poems, plays, short stories, novellas and novels. His works have been translated to German and Italian. His works are heavily metafictional and have influenced a newer generation of Brazilian writers.

Death
Sérgio Sant'Anna died on 10 May 2020, in Rio de Janeiro, after being hospitalized with COVID-19 symptoms during the COVID-19 pandemic in Brazil.

Bibliography
 O Sobrevivente, 1969
 Notas de Manfredo Rangel, Repórter (A respeito de Kramer), 1973
 Confissões de Ralfo, novel, 1975
 Simulacros, novel, 1977
 Um Romance de Geração, play, 1981
 O Concerto de João Gilberto no Rio de Janeiro, short stories, 1982
 Junk-Box, poetry, 1984
 A Tragédia Brasileira: Romance-Teatro, novel/play, 1987
 Senhorita Simpson, short stories, 1989
 Uma Breve História do Espírito, short stories, 1991
 O Monstro, short stories, 1994
 Um crime delicado, novel, 1997
 O vôo da madrugada, short stories, 2003 (translated as "The Extra Flight")
 O livro de Praga, novel, 2011
 Páginas sem glória, short stories, 2012
 O homem-mulher, short stories, 2014
 O conto zero, short stories, 2016
 Anjo noturno, short stories, 2017

References 

1941 births
2020 deaths
20th-century Brazilian male writers
Brazilian male short story writers
20th-century Brazilian short story writers
20th-century Brazilian novelists
20th-century Brazilian dramatists and playwrights
21st-century Brazilian male writers
21st-century Brazilian short story writers
21st-century Brazilian dramatists and playwrights
21st-century Brazilian novelists
Brazilian male novelists
Brazilian male dramatists and playwrights
Writers from Rio de Janeiro (city)
Deaths from the COVID-19 pandemic in Rio de Janeiro (state)